The Black Mountains are a mountain range located in the southeastern part of Inyo County, California, within southeastern Death Valley National Park.

Geography

Their formation has been classified as the Amargosa Chaos.

Lower Death Valley lies to the west & southwest of the Black Mountains section, with Greenwater Valley and the Greenwater Range to the northeast. The Black Mountains and Greenwater Range abut the Funeral Mountains on the north, also at the southern terminus of the Amargosa Range. The Amargosa River turns south-southwest, around the three sub-ranges, then northwest into Death Valley. The Owlshead Mountains are to the south across the Amargosa River and its steep descent into Death Valley.

Features
Dante's View and Coffin Peak lie at the northern end of the range. The Amargosa Desert is

History
The Lila C Mine, of "The Borax King" Francis Marion Smith and his Pacific Coast Borax Company, was developed to mine borax just east of the range. Around 1914 he built the Death Valley Railroad to primarily serve the newer Ryan C. Mine above it within the Black Mountains, with a spur to the Lila C. tracks.

See also
 Gower Gulch (Death Valley)

References

Mountain ranges of the Mojave Desert
Mountain ranges of Inyo County, California
Amargosa Desert
Death Valley National Park